Dolf van der Wal (born 21 July 1987, Huizen) is a Dutch snowboarder. He has competed at the 2014 Winter Olympics in Sochi.

He is the younger brother of the late comedian Floor van der Wal.

References

1987 births
Living people
Dutch male snowboarders
Snowboarders at the 2010 Winter Olympics
Snowboarders at the 2014 Winter Olympics
Olympic snowboarders of the Netherlands
People from Huizen
Sportspeople from North Holland